Buffalo Niagara may refer to a variety of places and things in the vicinity of Buffalo, New York, and Niagara Falls.

Geography
Buffalo–Niagara Falls metropolitan area
Buffalo Niagara Region

Infrastructure
Buffalo Niagara International Airport
Buffalo and Niagara Falls Railroad

Organizations